"Chocolate" is a song from The Time's 1990 album Pandemonium. The song was released as the second single from Pandemonium.

Track listing

7" single
"Chocolate" #2 (7" Remix / Edit) – 4:35
"My Drawers" – (3:57)

Maxi single
"Chocolate" (7" Remix / Edit) – 4:35
"Chocolate" (12inch Remix) – (7:59)	 
"Chocolate" (Tootsie Roll Club Mix) – (6:11)	 
"Chocolate" (Instrumental) – (7:29)	 
"Chocolate" (Percapella) – (7:23)	 
"My Drawers" – (3:57)

The Time (band) songs
1983 songs
Songs written by Prince (musician)
Paisley Park Records singles
Song recordings produced by Prince (musician)